Abdullah Kiğılı (born 1943 in Malatya) is a Turkish businessman. He originates from Kiğı, Bingöl and his family name Kiğılı means "person from Kiğı".

Kiğılı is owner of the  company, one of the leading clothing brands in Turkey, founded in 1965. He is a graduate of Istanbul High School.

He serves as the vice-president of Fenerbahçe SK since 22 May 2009 and also been board member between 14 June 1998 – 20 February 2000.

He was elected President of the Turkish Football Federation, serving between 9 September and 23 October 1997.

References

External links
Official Web Page of Abdullah Kiğılı Brand
Online Abdullah Kiğılı Brand Web Page

1943 births
Living people
People from Malatya
Fenerbahçe S.K. board members
Turkish businesspeople
Istanbul High School alumni
Turkish Football Federation presidents